Pseudanarta actura is a species of cutworm or dart moth in the family Noctuidae. It is found in North America.

The MONA or Hodges number for Pseudanarta actura is 9602.

Subspecies
These two subspecies belong to the species Pseudanarta actura:
 Pseudanarta actura actura
 Pseudanarta actura ate Dyar, 1921

References

Further reading

 
 
 

Xylenini
Articles created by Qbugbot
Moths described in 1908